William Fielding may refer to:

 William Stevens Fielding (1848–1929), Canadian journalist, politician, and Premier of Nova Scotia
 William Fielding (architect) (1875–1946), New Zealand architect, and bowls player
 Bill Fielding (1915–2006), English footballer

See also
William Feilding (disambiguation)